Walid Sedik Mohamed (born August 22, 1993) is an Egyptian boxer. He competed at the 2016 Summer Olympics in the men's welterweight event, in which he was eliminated in the round of 32 by Josh Kelly of Great Britain.

References

1993 births
Living people
Egyptian male boxers
Olympic boxers of Egypt
Boxers at the 2016 Summer Olympics
Mediterranean Games medalists in boxing
Welterweight boxers
Mediterranean Games gold medalists for Egypt
Competitors at the 2018 Mediterranean Games
21st-century Egyptian people